Dobrolevo is a village in Northwestern Bulgaria.
It is located in Borovan Municipality, Vratsa Province.

External links
 Dobrolevo

Villages in Vratsa Province